Edward Anderton Reade,  (15 March 1807 – 12 February 1886), was a British civil servant in India who served in Bengal from 1826 to 1860.

Career
On 10 February 1835 Reade was appointed as Joint Magistrate and Deputy Collector of Belah. On 8 September 1836 he was appointed as Magistrate & Collector of Goruckpore. He was given additional responsibility, on 24 October 1836, as Deputy Opium Agent for management of provision of opium in Goruckpore. He remained collector of Goruckpore (at least) till October 1844.

During 1857 Reade was Commissioner of the Fifth Division and Commissioner of the Benares Division. From 10 September 1857 to 30 September 1857 he held the position of Lieutenant-Governor of the North-Western Provinces as an In charge (acting). He retired from the East India Company in 1860 and returned to the family home in Ipsden, Oxfordshire, where he served as a magistrate for Oxfordshire and Berkshire.

He was a brother of the novelist Charles Reade, and the father of the New Zealand cricketer Lawrence Reade.

Works
His works include:

 Minute on the Roads in the Azimgurh District

References

External links
 INDIA-L Archives
 English village architecture By R. J. Brown
 Bulletins and other state intelligence #2149
 Empire and Information By Christopher Alan Bayly
 Official Descriptive and Illustrated Catalogue By Great Exhibition, Robert Ellis, Great Britain. Commissioners for the Exhibition of 1851 #859

Companions of the Order of the Bath
British East India Company civil servants
Indian Civil Service (British India) officers
Lieutenant-Governors of the North-Western Provinces
1807 births
1886 deaths